Thomas Eastwood Dickinson (11 January 1931 – 25 June 2018) was an Australian-born first-class cricket player for Lancashire in 1950 and 1951 and for Somerset in 1957. But he decided against a full-time cricket career and became a schoolmaster. He was born in Parramatta, Sydney, Australia.

Life and career
Though born in Australia, Dickinson was educated in England at Blackburn Grammar School and Manchester University, where he gained a BSc in Maths. A right-arm fast-medium bowler and a left-handed tail-end batsman, he played Lancashire League cricket for East Lancashire from the age of 15 and made his first-class debut for Lancashire as a 19-year-old in 1950, playing as an amateur. Such was the dominance of Lancashire's spin attack of Roy Tattersall, Bob Berry, Malcolm Hilton and Peter Greenwood that Dickinson bowled only 56 overs in his four matches for the side in 1950 and 1951, never taking more than one wicket in any innings. In the mid-1950s, he turned out for The Army in non-first-class matches.

He was appointed Head of Maths at Queen's College, Taunton. During the summer holidays in August 1957 he played in five consecutive matches for Somerset. In his first match, against Glamorgan, he took five wickets for 36 in the first innings, sharing all 10 wickets in the innings with Bryan Lobb, who took five for 63. In the following match, he was again Somerset's most successful bowler against a full-strength Surrey side heading for its sixth consecutive County Championship: he took four for 80, though Surrey won the match. But after taking 17 wickets at an average of less than 20 runs per wicket, he did not appear in first-class matches again, though he played for Somerset's second eleven in Minor Counties matches in the school holidays in 1958.

Dickinson's batting was negligible, and in nine first-class matches he did not ever reach double figures. The Somerset historian David Foot, however, remembered his batting style: "More than once I saw him switch from left to right hand in the middle of an over – not to attempt the contentious reverse sweep but to deceive the fielders and show he could play the cover drive on both sides," he wrote. "They used to say he could also bowl with either hand."

He taught at Queen's College for 29 years before retiring to Nottinghamshire.

References

External links
 
 

1931 births
2018 deaths
Australian cricketers
Lancashire cricketers
Somerset cricketers
Cricketers from Sydney